Lipnica is a settlement along Lipnica Creek in the Municipality of Radovljica in the Upper Carniola region of Slovenia.

Name
The name Lipnica, like related names (e.g., Lipa, Lipnik, Lipovec, etc.), is derived from the Slovene common noun lipa 'linden', referring to the local vegetation.

References

External links
Lipnica at Geopedia

Populated places in the Municipality of Radovljica